Chad Burt (born March 3, 1988) is an American soccer coach and retired player.

Career

College and Amateur 
Burt attended Northeast High School and played college soccer at the University of Tampa from 2005 to 2006. During his college years, Burt broke two freshman records (Most starts as a freshman) (Most minutes played as a freshman) also played with the Colorado Rapids U23's and the Atlanta Silverbacks U23'sin the USL Premier Development League.

Professionally
Burt played professional indoor soccer for Milwaukee Wave in the Major Indoor Soccer League in 2008–09, scoring six goals in 20 games for team.

Burt signed for the FC Tampa Bay in the USSF Division 2 Professional League in March 2010 and made his professional debut on April 16, 2010, in Tampa's first-ever game, a 1–0 victory over Crystal Palace Baltimore. He scored his first professional goal on October 1, 2010, in a 6–3 victory, again over Crystal Palace Baltimore. The club moved to the North American Soccer League in 2011. After spending the 2011 season with FC Tampa Bay, the club announced on October 4, 2011, that it would not re-sign Burt for the 2012 season.

On July 11, 2014, FC Edmonton signed Burt after he trialled with them during their mid-season Western Canada friendly tour.

Coaching
Burt is an assistant director of coaching for the Strictly Soccer Futbol Club (SSFC), a FYSA Region C Club in St. Petersburg, Florida.

On January 16, 2020, Burt was announced as an assistant coach for the Tampa Bay Rowdies of USL Championship. Burt left his position with the Rowdies following the 2021 season.

References

1988 births
Living people
American expatriate soccer players
American soccer players
Atlanta Silverbacks U23's players
Colorado Rapids U-23 players
FC Edmonton players
Milwaukee Wave players
North American Soccer League players
USL League Two players
Tampa Bay Rowdies players
Tampa Spartans men's soccer players
USSF Division 2 Professional League players
VSI Tampa Bay FC players
USL Championship players
Association football midfielders
Soccer players from St. Petersburg, Florida
Tampa Bay Rowdies coaches